Burks–Guy–Hagen House is a historic home located at Bedford, Virginia. It was built about 1884, and is a two-story, brick dwelling in a Victorian Villa style.  It features a three-level square tower with a mansard roof and complex bracketed wooden gable with a hood or "apron".  It is set among romantically landscaped grounds and wood-bordered rear meadow.  The house was built for Judge Martin P. Burks (1851-1928).

It was listed on the National Register of Historic Places in 1985.

References

Houses on the National Register of Historic Places in Virginia
Victorian architecture in Virginia
Houses completed in 1884
National Register of Historic Places in Bedford, Virginia
Houses in Bedford County, Virginia
1884 establishments in Virginia